An idiosyncrasy is an unusual feature of a person (though there are also other uses, see below). It can also mean an odd habit. The term is often used to express eccentricity or peculiarity. A synonym may be "quirk".

Etymology

Linguistics
The term can also be applied to symbols or words. Idiosyncratic symbols mean one thing for a particular person, as a blade could mean war, but to someone else, it could symbolize a surgery.

Idiosyncratic property
In phonology, an idiosyncratic property contrasts with a systematic regularity. While systematic regularities in the sound system of a language are useful for identifying phonological rules during analysis of the forms morphemes can take, idiosyncratic properties are those whose occurrence is not determined by those rules. For example, the fact that the English word cab starts with a /c/ is an idiosyncratic property; on the other hand that its vowel is longer than in the English word cap  is a systematic regularity, as it arises from the fact that the final consonant is voiced rather than voiceless.

Idiosyncrasy in religion
Among religious people, idiosyncrasy means behavior that is different from the usual, different from that which is generally seen as common, yet also as different social behavior that can be seen in the varieties of cults.

Medicine

Disease 
Idiosyncrasy defined the way physicians conceived diseases in the 19th century. They considered each disease as a unique condition, related to each patient. This understanding began to change in the 1870s, when discoveries made by researchers in Europe permitted the advent of a "scientific medicine", a precursor to the evidence-based medicine that is the standard of practice today.

Pharmacology
The term idiosyncratic drug reaction denotes an aberrant or bizarre reaction or hypersensitivity to a substance, without connection to the pharmacology of the drug. It is what is known as a Type B reaction. Type B reactions have the following characteristics: they are usually unpredictable, might not be picked up by toxicological screening, not necessarily dose-related, incidence and morbidity low but mortality is high. Type B reactions are most commonly immunological (e.g. penicillin allergy).

Psychiatry and psychology
In psychiatry, the term means a specific and unique mental condition of a patient, often accompanied by neologisms. In psychoanalysis and behaviorism, it is used for the personal way a given individual reacts, perceives and experiences a common situation: a certain dish made of meat may cause nostalgic memories in one person and disgust in another. These reactions are called idiosyncratic.

Economics
In portfolio theory, risks of price changes due to the unique circumstances of a specific security, as opposed to the overall market, are called "idiosyncratic risks". This specific risk, also called unsystematic, can be nulled out of a portfolio through diversification. Pooling multiple securities means the specific risks cancel out. In complete markets, there is no compensation for idiosyncratic risk—that is, a security's idiosyncratic risk does not matter for its price. For instance, in a complete market in which the capital asset pricing model holds, the price of a security is determined by the amount of systematic risk in its returns. Net income received, or losses suffered, by a landlord from renting of one or two properties is subject to idiosyncratic risk due to the numerous things that can happen to real property and variable behavior of tenants.

According to one macroeconomic model including a financial sector, hedging idiosyncratic risk can be self-defeating as it leads to higher systemic risk, as it takes on more leverage. This makes the system less stable. Thus, while securitisation in principle reduces the costs of idiosyncratic shocks, it ends up amplifying systemic risks in equilibrium.

In econometrics, "idiosyncratic error" is used to describe error—that is, unobserved factors that impact the dependent variable—from panel data that both changes over time and across units (individuals, firms, cities, towns, etc.).

See also 
Eccentricity (behavior)

References

External links 

Allergology
Deviance (sociology)
Inborn errors of metabolism
Medical terminology
Effects of external causes